Jan M. Rost is a German theoretical physicist and director at the Max Planck Institute for the Physics of Complex Systems in Dresden heading the research department Finite Systems. He was awarded the status of Fellow in the American Physical Society, after  nomination by the Division of Atomic, Molecular & Optical Physics in 2007, for seminal investigations of correlated doubly excited states, threshold fragmentation in few-body Coulombic systems and small clusters, pendular states of linear molecules, and for elucidating the role of correlation and relaxation in ultracold plasmas and Rydberg gases.

His research interests reach from ultracold to ultrafast dynamics in finite systems including Rydberg excitation and ionization. Former group leaders of his department are among others Andreas Buchleitner, Andreas Becker, Klaus Hornberger, Stefan Skupin, Nina Rohringer and Thomas Pohl.

He was Editor in Chief of Journal of Physics B, chairman of the SAMOP section of the German Physical Society, chair of the Chemical-Physical-Technical Section of the Max Planck Society and is presently lead editor of Physical Review A and member of the Wissenschaftsrat advising German Science politics.

References 

Fellows of the American Physical Society
American Physical Society
21st-century German physicists
Living people
Date of death missing
Year of birth missing (living people)
Max Planck Institute directors